FareShare is a charity network established in 1994, which aims at relieving food poverty and reducing food waste in the United Kingdom. It does this by obtaining good quality surplus food from the food industry that would otherwise have gone to waste and sending it to frontline charities and community groups across the UK.

FareShare works with all sectors of the supply chain: producers, manufacturers and retailers. A number of the major UK food retailers have encouraged their suppliers to work with FareShare to minimise food waste.

History 
In December 1994, homelessness charity Crisis partnered with Sainsbury's to establish Crisis FareShare, a London-based operation which aimed to co-ordinate the redistribution of surplus food from industry donors to hostels and homeless shelters in the city. Marks & Spencer and Pret a Manger were among its first suppliers. By 1999, the charity was operating out of seven cities, including Birmingham, Manchester and Huddersfield.

In 2004, FareShare became an independent charity, in order to expand its operation further and support others beside the homeless. The FareShare network currently comprises more than twenty regional centres throughout the UK, although the majority of these are independently managed by local organisations.

In 2015, FareShare launched its FareShare Go app, which connects frontline charities with local supermarkets that have surplus stock available. Participating supermarkets include Tesco, Waitrose and Asda, and in 2022, Booker became the first wholesaler to sign up to the scheme.

In February 2018, Asda committed to a £20 million investment in FareShare and The Trussell Trust, with the aim of helping more than one million people out of food poverty over the following three years. This included the funding of new refrigeration equipment and delivery vehicles.

During the Covid-19 lockdowns starting on 23 March 2020, the FareShare network remained open and operational to continue to get food to vulnerable people. In the first month of lockdown, the amount of surplus food received and distributed by FareShare more than doubled, following the overnight closure of the restaurant, pub, hotel and catering trades. Supermarket partners such as the Co-op also provided additional food donations and funding to help FareShare meet the increased demand from frontline charity members. In December 2020, the company received a £16 million government grant to support its operation through the winter.

According to its annual report, FareShare redistributed 53,894 tonnes of food in 2021/2022, equivalent to 128.3 million meals. This food is delivered to a broad range of frontline charities and community groups across the UK including foodbanks, homeless shelters, day centres, women's refuge centres and children's breakfast clubs.

Initiatives
FareShare provides food for children's holiday clubs as part of its #ActiveAte campaign, which endeavours to raise the profile of the issue of "Holiday Hunger", where children eligible for a free school lunch do not have access to this meal during the 13 weeks of school holidays. In 2020, FareShare partnered with England and Manchester United footballer Marcus Rashford, who now works with the charity to raise awareness of this issue and to campaign for donations from industry suppliers. Rashford also leads the Child Food Poverty Taskforce, of which FareShare is a founding member; the taskforce seeks the urgent implementation of the three recommendations focused on supporting children in the National Food Strategy published by Henry Dimbleby.

Awards
In 2010, FareShare won "Britain's Most Admired Charity" at the Third Sector awards. In 2017, it won "Charity of the Year" at both the Charity Times awards and Third Sector Awards, and was selected for The Telegraph's Christmas Charity Appeal. In 2019, the charity won the Food and Drink Federation's Campaign of the Year award for the Feed People First campaign, which helped to unlock £15 million of DEFRA funding to "level the playing field" for the food industry of the cost to redistribute food to vulnerable people, as opposed to sending it to landfill or anaerobic digestion. It also won the Charity Times 2019 award for "Corporate National Partnership with a Retailer" and the Business Charity Awards 2019 "Consortium" award, along with the Trussell Trust and Asda, for the "Fight Hunger Create Change" project.

See also
Food waste in the United Kingdom
Hunger in the United Kingdom
Poverty in the United Kingdom

References

External links
Official website

Social welfare charities based in the United Kingdom
Food and the environment
Food security
Organizations established in 2004
2004 establishments in the United Kingdom
Food waste in the United Kingdom
Hunger relief organizations